Musiq'3 is a Belgian public-service radio station operated by RTBF. Its output is centred on classical music. The current director is Bernard Meillat.

The channel first went on air – as the Troisième Programme of the then existing RTB (Radio-télévision belge, RTB) – on 1 October 1961. Later known as Radio Trois in the late 1970s and Musique 3 in October 1994, the channel's present branding, Musiq'3, was adopted in March 2004 as part of the overall restructuring of RTBF's radio services which took place in that year.

Reception

FM
 Ardennes and Luxembourg: 94.1
 Brussels and Walloon Brabant: 91.2
 Charleroi: 97.1
 Chimay: 91.6
 Hainaut: 102.6
 La Louvière and Binche: 97.9
 La Roche-en-Ardenne: 97.6
 Mons: 88.5
 Liège: 99.5
 Namur and Basse-Sambre: 92.8
 Tubize and Braine-le-Château: 94.0

DAB
Broadcasting only in DAB+, Common AudioID : 6353 @ 96kb
 Bruxelles & Brabant Wallon 
 Bloc 6D - 187.072 MHz
 Liège
 Bloc 6B - 183.648 MHz
 Namur & Sud Luxembourg
 Bloc 6C - 185.360 MHz
 Hainaut & Nord Pas de Calais (France)
 Bloc 6A - 181.936 MHz

Satellite
 Hot Bird 9 13.0°E – 10.930 H, DVB-S2, 8PSK SR: 30000 FEC: 2/3, (encrypted) Audio: 114

Digital terrestrial television
 UHF channel 45, 56 and 66

Internet
 http://www.rtbf.be/radio/liveradio/musiq3

On demand content 
Programmes available on demand from Musiq'3 are:
 Appassionato
 Autour De Babel
 Carnet Da Notes
 Concerts
 En Scene
 Le Feuilleton
 Hamlet
 Indicatif Présent
 Info Culturelle
 Jazz
 Journees speciales
 Le Passe Compose
 Les Classiques De Demain
 Musiq'Academies
 Musique Et Autres Muses
 Musiques De Film
 Plein-Jeu
 Reperes
 Si ça Vous Chante
 Table D'écoute
 Terre De Sons

See also
 Classic21
 La Première
 Pure
 VivaCité
 RTBF International

References

External links
 Musiq'3
 RTBF

1961 establishments in Belgium
Classical music radio stations
French-language radio stations in Belgium
Mass media in Brussels
Radio stations established in 1961